The 2015 CFU Club Championship was the 17th edition of CFU Club Championship, the annual international club football competition in the Caribbean region, held amongst clubs whose football associations are affiliated with the Caribbean Football Union (CFU). The top three teams in the tournament qualified for the 2015–16 CONCACAF Champions League. 

Central won the tournament by defeating fellow Trinidadian side W Connection in the final. Both teams qualified for the Champions League, along with Montego Bay United of Jamaica, who defeated Haitian side Don Bosco in the third place game.

The first round was held in April 2015 at sites in Haiti, Guyana, and Trinidad and Tobago. The final round was played in May 2015 in Trinidad and Tobago.

Teams

The tournament was open to all league champions and runners-up from each of the 31 CFU member associations (or cup winners if the league was not played), once their competition ended on or before the end of 2014. 

A total of 15 teams from 9 CFU associations entered the competition, as they met the registration and fee payment deadline of January 7, 2015. This is the first CFU Club Championship to feature a team from the Bahamas, with Lyford Cay Dragons as their entrant.

There are no defending champions as no final was played in 2014.

Schedule

First round
In the first round, the 15 teams were divided into three groups of four and one group of three, with each group containing at least two league champions. Each group was played on a round-robin basis, hosted by one of the teams at a centralized venue. The winners of each group advanced to the semi-finals.

Group 1
Hosted by Alpha United in Providence, Guyana (all times UTC−4).

Group 2
Hosted by W Connection in Couva, Trinidad and Tobago (all times UTC−4).

Notes

Group 3
Hosted by América des Cayes in Les Cayes, Haiti (all times UTC−4).

Group 4
Hosted by Don Bosco in Port-au-Prince, Haiti (all times UTC−4).

Final round
In the final round, the four teams played matches on a knock-out basis, hosted by one of the teams at a centralized venue. The semi-final winners played in the final while the losers played in the third place match.

Bracket
Hosted in Couva, Trinidad and Tobago (all times UTC−4).
In the original fixtures published by the CFU, the winners of Groups 1 and 2 were to play in one semi-final, while the winners of Groups 3 and 4 were to play in the other semi-final. The semi-final matchups were changed by the CFU after the completion of the first round.

Semi-finals
Winners qualified for the 2015–16 CONCACAF Champions League.

Third place match
Winner qualified for the 2015–16 CONCACAF Champions League.

Final

Top goalscorers

References

External links
CFU Club Championship, CFUfootball.org

2015
1
2015–16 CONCACAF Champions League